The Tab Hunter Show is an American situation comedy starring Tab Hunter which centers around a young comic-strip artist and his romantic adventures. Original episodes aired on NBC from September 18, 1960, until April 30, 1961.

Cast
Tab Hunter....Paul Morgan
Richard Erdman....Peter Fairfield III
Jerome Cowan...John Larsen
Reta Shaw....Thelma

Synopsis

Paul Morgan is 29-year-old cartoonist who draws the daily comic strip Bachelor at Large. The strip is essentially his diary, based on his own life as a carefree bachelor in Malibu, California, which is filled with romantic adventures — and misadventures — both in Malibu and during his trips to Europe. Paul perpetually is surrounded by beautiful young women and spends a lot of time trying to gain the favor of a woman he meets or getting out of a relationship that seems to be turning serious. There often are complications, and he often gets in over his head while trying to impress a woman. His best friend Peter Fairfield III is a rich-but-stingy playboy who loves beautiful women, fashion, and fast cars and often is mixed up in Paul's romantic romps. Paul's housekeeper, Thelma, disapproves of the steady stream of women passing through Paul's life and frequently tells him so.

Paul works for Comics, Inc., where his boss is John Larsen. Paul often exasperates Larsen, who is dumbfounded by Paul's antics and frequently has difficulty keeping Paul on task and on deadline in drawing his comic strip. Bachelor at Large is wildly popular and a big moneymaker for the company, however, so as long as Paul turns his strips in on time, Larsen forgives his transgressions.

Production

For the 1960–1961 television season, NBC hoped to counter criticism that network television aired too many violent action-adventure shows by creating a four-hour Sunday-evening lineup completely devoted to family-friendly programming. A particularly important component of the new lineup involved replacing the live comedy and variety shows that previously had dominated the 8:00–9:00 p.m. slot on Sunday evenings on NBC with filmed situation comedies. National Velvet at 8:00 p.m. and  The Tab Hunter Show at 8:30 p.m. were the situation comedies NBC chose to fill the hour beginning in September 1960.

Stanley Shapiro created and produced The Tab Hunter Show, which gave 1950s movie heartthrob Tab Hunter his own television show in the hope of attracting young women and girls to NBC on Sunday evenings, and each week the show featured a beautiful young woman as a guest star in the hope of attracting young men and boys as viewers as well. When NBC announced the show in March 1960, it referred to it with the title Bachelor at Large, but by mid-April 1960 it had received the name The Tab Hunter Show.

When The Tab Hunter Show premiered in September 1960, Hunter was at the peak of his career, having received acclaim for his performance in the 1958 theatrical film Damn Yankees, and he explained that he wanted to switch to a television series — considered a noteworthy development in the entertainment world at the time — because he felt that it was a medium that would allow him greater freedom to act. It was his first comedic role.

Zeke Zekley, best known for his work on George McManus′s comic strip Bringing Up Father, drew the strips for The Tab Hunter Show. Pete Rugolo composed the show's theme music.

In July 1960, Hunter was arrested for beating his dog, a charge that later was dropped when it turned out that Hunter's neighbor had fabricated the story out of spite. The arrest nonetheless marred the show's September 1960 premiere.

Critical reception

When The Tab Hunter Show premiered in September 1960, critics generally gave it mediocre reviews. Cynthia Lowry of the Associated Press and John Crosby of the Hartford Courant both noted that the show's premise was very close to that of The Bob Cummings Show of 1955–1959, Lowry finding the similarity "embarassingly reminiscent" of the earlier show while Crosby assessed that the women featured on The Tab Hunter Show were "more stunning" than those on The Bob Cummings Show, but that Tab Hunter lacked Bob Cummings's talent for comedy. Percy Shain of The Boston Globe noted that show plots would be repetitive and predicted that young people would like the show more than older viewers. Jack Gould of The New York Times found the show's plots far-fetched, but thought younger teenagers might enjoy it.

In early November 1960, with The Tab Hunter Show having been on the air for almost two months, critic Steven H. Scheuer wrote that the show had “started off pleasantly enough but has deteriorated into a series of clichés about the bachelor with the roving eye.”

Broadcast history

The Tab Hunter Show premiered on September 18, 1960, and aired on Sundays at 8:30 p.m. throughout its run. Unable to compete in its time slot with the very popular The Ed Sullivan Show, The Tab Hunter Show drew moderate ratings; after its last new episode aired on April 30, 1961, NBC announced its cancellation in May 1961 after a single season. Prime-time reruns of the show continued until September 10, 1961.

The Tab Hunter Show had greater success in the United Kingdom, where the BBC broadcast 24 episodes of it from January 5 to September 26, 1961, at first on Thursdays at 7:30 p.m. and then on Tuesdays at 8:00 p.m.

Episodes
Sources

References

External links
The Tab Hunter Show opening credits on YouTube
Remembering some of the cast from The Tab Hunter Show on YouTube
The Tab Hunter Show episode  "Portia Go Home" (1960) on YouTube
The Tab Hunter Show episode  "Portia Go Home" with J. Pat O'Malley, Joanna Barnes, and Richard Erdman (1960) on YouTube

NBC original programming
1960s American sitcoms
1960 American television series debuts
1961 American television series endings
Television shows set in Malibu, California